Miarus is a genus of beetles belonging to the family Curculionidae.

The species of this genus are found in Europe, Africa, Japan and Northern America.

Species:
 Miarus abeillei Desbrochers, 1893 
 Miarus abnormis Solari, 1947

References

Curculionidae
Curculionidae genera